The Southern Illinois University (SIUC) School of Music aka SOM is part of the College of Liberal Arts, and a focal point of cultural learning and activity at SIUC. Housed in Altgeld Hall (built in 1896), the Old Baptist Foundation Building and Shryock Auditorium, the School of Music is central to the campus both geographically and culturally.

Available Degrees 
 Bachelors of Music (BM)
 Bachelor of Arts (BA)
 Bachelor of Fine Arts (BFA)
 Music Minor

Undergraduate Degrees 
 Music Business 
 Music Education
 Music Theory/Composition
 Musical Theater 
 Piano Pedagogy
 Performance:
 Keyboard
 Instrumental
 Voice
 Guitar
 Studio Jazz
 Liberal Arts, Music

Graduate Degrees 
The SIUC School of Music offers the Master of Music Degree in the following concentrations:

 Collaborative Piano
 Instrumental Accompanying
 Vocal Accompanying
 Music Education
 Music History and Literature
 Music Theory and Composition
 Opera/Musical Theater
 Performance
 Choral Conducting
 Guitar
 Orchestral Instruments
 Orchestral Conducting
 Piano
 Vocal
 Wind Conducting
 Piano Pedagogy (Piano Education Arts)

Ensembles 
Orchestras
Southern Illinois Symphony Orchestra
Civic Orchestra
Junior Orchestra

University bands
University Wind Ensemble
Symphonic Band
Marching Salukis

Jazz
Studio Jazz Orchestra
Lab Jazz Orchestra
Jazz Combos

Vocal ensembles
Concert Choir
Choral Union
Chamber Singers

Other ensembles
Opera / Musical Theater
Guitar Ensemble
Clarinet Studio
New Music Ensemble

Notable faculty
 Michael D. Hanes, percussionist and former director of bands
 Marjorie Lawrence, voice and opera professor
 Eric Mandat, clarinetist and composer

Notable alumni

 Vincent Chancey, French horn player
 Sean Osborn, clarinet player
 Brent Wallarab, arranger, composer, and teacher

Organizations 
 Phi Mu Alpha Sinfonia Fraternity (ΦΜΑ) - Epsilon Kappa Chapter
 Mu Phi Epsilon (ΜΦΕ) International Coed Fraternity
 Sigma Alpha Iota (ΣΑΙ) - Theta Tau Chapter
 National Association for Music Education
 Music Business Association

References 

Music
Carbondale, Illinois
Music schools in Illinois
Performing arts in Illinois